The divine call, unitarian call, or  da‘wat at-tawḥīd is the time period of Druze proselytization
that was opened at sunset on Thursday 30 May 1017 CE by Fātimid Caliph al-Hakim bi-Amr Allah and closed in 1043 CE by al-Muqtana Baha'uddin, henceforth prohibiting anyone else from converting to the Druze religion.

History 
The call was suspended briefly between 19 May 1018 and 9 May 1019 CE during the apostasy of ad-Darazi and again between 1021 and 1026 CE during a period of persecution by Ali az-Zahir for those who had sworn the oath to accept the call. Persecutions started forty days after the disappearance into occultation of al-Hakim, who was thought to have been converting people to a Unitarian faith for over twenty years prior. Al-Hakim convinced some heretical followers such as ad-Darazi of his soteriological divinity and officially declared the Divine call after issuing a decree promoting religious freedom.

The call summoned people to a true unitarian belief that removed all attributes (wise, just, outside, inside, etc.) from God. It promoted absolute monotheism and the concepts of supporting your fellow man, true speech and pursuit of oneness with God. These concepts superseded all ritual, law and dogma and requirements for pilgrimage, fasting, holy days, prayer, charity, devotion, profession of faith and particular worship of any prophet or person was downplayed. Islamic law was opposed and Druze traditions started during the call continue today, such as meeting for reading, prayer and social gathering on a Thursday instead of a Friday at Khalwats instead of mosques. Such gatherings and traditions were not compulsory and people were encouraged to pursue a state of compliance with the real law of nature governing the universe. Epistle thirteen of the Epistles of Wisdom called it "A spiritual doctrine without any ritualistic imposition". The time of the call was seen as a revolution of truth, with missionaries preaching its message all around the Middle East. These messengers were sent out with the Druze epistles and took written vows from believers, whose souls are thought to still exist in the Druze of today. The souls of those who took the vows during the call are believed to be continuously reincarnating in successive generations of Druze until the return of al-Hakim to proclaim a second Divine call and establish a golden age of justice and peace for all.

In 1043 al-Muqtana declared that the sect would no longer accept new pledges, and since that time proselytization has been prohibited awaiting al-Hakim's return on Judgement day to usher in a new golden age.

See also 
Hamza ibn-'Ali ibn-Ahmad
ad-Darazi
Baha’ud-Dīn as-Samuqī

References

External links
 AbouFakher, Rabeea., The Tahwid Faith

History of the Druze
11th century in religion
Religious conversion